The Journal of Developmental Entrepreneurship covers research on micro-enterprise and small business development. The journal is published by World Scientific and covers topics such as: entrepreneurship and self-employment in developing contexts, marketing patterns and approaches in venture growth and development, industry practices, and economic and social impacts of micro-enterprise activity.

It is indexed in  CSA Human Population & Natural Resource Management, CSA Sustainability Science Abstracts, ABI Inform, and Scopus.

External links 
 

Business and management journals
Publications established in 1996
World Scientific academic journals
Quarterly journals
English-language journals